Mimeresia neavei is a butterfly in the family Lycaenidae. It is found in Uganda, the Democratic Republic of the Congo (Uele and North Kivu), western Kenya and north-western Tanzania. The habitat consists of forests.

References

Butterflies described in 1921
Poritiinae